Tubulaniformes is an order of worms belonging to the class Palaeonemertea.

Families:
 Callineridae Bergendal, 1901
 Carinomellidae Chernyshev, 1995
 Tubulanidae Bürger, 1905

References

Nemerteans